Adam Pankey (born February 2, 1994) is an American football offensive tackle for the New York Jets of the National Football League (NFL). He played college football at West Virginia. He is the son of Leslie Campbell and has two brothers, Blaise Wright and Devan Pankey.

College career
At West Virginia, Pankey was named second-team All-Big 12 at right guard his senior season.

Professional career

Green Bay Packers
Pankey signed with the Green Bay Packers as an undrafted free agent on May 5, 2017. He was waived by the Packers on September 2, 2017 and was signed to the practice squad the next day. He was promoted to the active roster on September 13, 2017.

Pankey was re-signed on March 13, 2018. He was waived on September 1, 2018 and was signed to the practice squad the next day. He was promoted to the active roster on December 8, 2018 and saw playing time the next day in a 34–20 victory over the Atlanta Falcons.

On August 31, 2019, Pankey was waived by the Packers.

Tennessee Titans
On September 2, 2019, Pankey was signed to the Tennessee Titans practice squad.

Green Bay Packers (second stint)
On September 21, 2019, Pankey was signed by the Green Bay Packers off the Titans practice squad. He was waived on December 9, 2019.

Miami Dolphins
On December 10, 2019, Pankey was claimed off waivers by the Miami Dolphins.

On March 17, 2021, Pankey re-signed with the Dolphins. He was waived on August 31, 2021 and re-signed to the practice squad the next day. He signed a reserve/future contract with the Dolphins on January 11, 2022. He was released on August 29, 2022.

New York Jets
On September 21, 2022, Pankey was signed to the New York Jets practice squad. He was promoted to the active roster on January 7, 2023.

References

1994 births
Living people
Players of American football from Ohio
Sportspeople from the Cincinnati metropolitan area
People from Hamilton County, Ohio
American football offensive linemen
West Virginia Mountaineers football players
Green Bay Packers players
Tennessee Titans players
Miami Dolphins players
New York Jets players